Jerzy Adam Kraska (born 24 December 1951, in Płock) is a Polish former professional footballer who played as a defender.

On the national level he played for Poland national team (13 matches) and was a participant at the 1972 Summer Olympics, where his team won the gold medal.

References

External links
  Polish Olympic Committee website

1951 births
Living people
Sportspeople from Płock
Association football defenders
Polish footballers
Poland international footballers
Footballers at the 1972 Summer Olympics
Olympic gold medalists for Poland
Olympic footballers of Poland
Polish football managers
Polonia Warsaw managers
Olympic medalists in football
Gwardia Warsaw players
Medalists at the 1972 Summer Olympics
Expatriate footballers in Finland
Kuopion Palloseura players